In March and April 2009, an outbreak of a new strain of influenza commonly referred to as "swine flu" infected many people in Mexico and other parts of the world, causing illness ranging from mild to severe. Initial reports suggested that the outbreak had started in February due to farming practices at a pig farm half-owned by Smithfield Foods. Smithfield Foods stated that it had found no clinical signs or symptoms of the presence of swine influenza in the company's swine herd, or among its employees at its joint ventures in Mexico, that it routinely administers influenza virus vaccination to their swine herds and that it conducts monthly testing for the presence of swine influenza.
The new strain was identified as a combination of several different strains of Influenzavirus A, subtype H1N1, including separate strains of this subtype circulating in humans and in pigs. The World Health Organization (WHO) and the U.S. Centers for Disease Control and Prevention (CDC) have expressed serious concerns that the new strain, which transmits between humans and has had a relatively high mortality rate in the possible and confirmed Mexican cases, has the potential to become an influenza pandemic. It is reported that, because the virus is already widespread, containment will be impossible.

As of April 27, 2009, all schools nationwide remained closed until at least May 6. Health Minister Córdova noted that the number of new cases had declined during the three days: from 141 on Saturday to 119 on Sunday and 110 on Monday. It is unclear why there were more deaths in Mexico than in other areas, as there were multiple potential variables, such as a stronger strain of the virus or more exposure to it. No definite conclusion had been reached, however the CDC reported that swine flu viruses in the US and Mexico matched.

Outbreak

The first infected was registered in San Diego, California, on April 2, 2009, but it was misclassified as an H2N3 case. It was not until April 13, with the first death in Oaxaca, that further research was carried out, officially detecting the new type of virus on April 16. The pandemic outbreak was first detected in the Federal District, where surveillance began picking up a surge in cases of influenza-like illness starting on March 18. The surge was assumed by authorities to be "late-season flu" (which usually coincides with a mild Influenzavirus B peak) until April 21, when a CDC alert concerning two isolated cases of a novel swine flu was reported in the media (see 2009 swine flu outbreak in the United States). Both cases were in US counties on the Mexico – United States border, adjacent to one state in Mexico where the influenza surge had been detected. This was the missing link that connected the surge and the new strain, and established the high suspicion of an outbreak. One study estimated that by the end of April, at least 113,000 to 375,000 people in Mexico had been infected. Then, in early May, influenza activity began to decline, likely due to the shutdown of most public places in response to the outbreak. However, H1N1 remains present in Mexico, and as of December, was classified by WHO as widespread.

Confirmed cases

Dr. José Ángel Córdova Villalobos, the federal Secretary of Health, stated on April 25, 2009 that since March, there had been over 1300 reported cases and put the death toll at 83, with 20 confirmed to be linked to a new swine influenza strain of Influenza A virus subtype H1N1. As of April 26 there have been 1,614 cases, with 103 deaths and about 400 patients in hospitals. Around two-thirds of the sick patients had recovered.

However, flu death toll in Mexico could be lower than first thought, said Dr. Gerald Evans, head of the Association of Medical Microbiology and Infectious Disease Canada and a member of a federal pandemic-planning committee, on April 29:
There was a lot of speculation and what seemed to be evidence there were dozens and dozens of deaths. Careful analysis showed these people likely died of something else, and not flu. That's really good news, and that would fit with what we've seen outside of Mexico.as of October 7, it is reported that more new cases of A/H1N1 were recorded in the month of September then in any other month-there were 9,231 new confirmed cases of A/H1N1 influenza in Mexico in September. It is important to remember that that number represents only confirmed cases, far more people infected with A/H1N1 influenza became only mildly ill, and recovered without seeing a doctor, and thus never had their cases confirmed or counted. Widespread closures of schools are unlikely, however, as it is known that the virus has a low mortality rate. "We know that the situation is not as serious as officials feared last spring" said health secretary Jose Angel Cordava.

Response

Both the World Health Organization and the U.S. Centers for Disease Control and Prevention have praised the response by the Mexican government, calling it "a model of rapid and transparent reporting, aggressive control measures, and generous sharing of data and samples" in addition to labeling it "courageous and impressive".

After a month since the first atypical pneumonia cases were detected, the Mexican government responded and established some measures in Mexico City, the State of Mexico and the State of San Luis Potosí, where the swine flu had spread, to decrease the risk of more infections. Hundreds of soldiers and police officers mobilized by the government have handed out six million surgical masks to citizens in and around Mexico City.
On April 24, 2009, schools (from pre-school to university level) as well as libraries, museums, concerts and any public gathering place, were shut down by the government in Mexico City and the neighboring State of Mexico to prevent the disease from spreading further; schools in Mexico City, the State of Mexico, and the state of San Luis Potosí will remain closed through at least May 5. Marcelo Ebrard, Mexico City's mayor, has also asked all night-life facilities operators to shut down their places for ten days to prevent further infections.
Health Secretary José Ángel Córdova said on April 24 that schools will probably be suspended for at least the following week then, and that it will take around ten days to see the evolution of the virus' behavior, and to consider other measures thereafter. On April 25, President Felipe Calderón declared an emergency which granted him the power to suspend public events and order quarantines. Hours later, Córdova announced classes will be officially suspended through May. 6 On April 26, Natividad González Parás, governor of the northeastern state of Nuevo León, announced that statewide schools will remain closed until May 6, and established a quarantine system in airports, central bus stations and the creation of observation points mainly in the southern part of the state at the nearest highways to the borders with other states, to realize tests conducted on people arriving from other states. Classes in Coahuila were cancelled on April 27 and 28, with the possibility of cancelling the rest of the week. On April 27, Health Secretary José Ángel Córdova announced that schools of all levels throughout the nation will be suspended until May 6 to prevent the spread of the flu.

As part of a marketing strategy, a mascot for the outbreak was released in Mexico City on April 29 depicting a blue plush virus with black eyes in reference of H1N1; but it was discontinued two days later.

Economic impact

The outbreak increased the strain on an economy already under pressure from the current economic crisis. Although the World Bank said it would extend Mexico $25 million in loans for immediate aid and $180 million in long-term assistance, it wasn't enough to restore customer investor confidence leading to the peso’s biggest tumble in six months. It seems likely now that Mexico will have to draw on a $47 billion credit line from the International Monetary Fund.

It has been reported that the food services sector within Mexico City is experiencing losses of over US$4.5 million per day. It has been reported that pork meat price has dropped 30% within Mexico; combined with several export bans, this will inflict severe damage to the industry.
Although the virus hasn't spread throughout the whole country, as a precaution all mass gatherings were prohibited, affecting the sports industry. Many Liga MX México Primera División teams reported direct losses of over $900,000 dollars per game after the Mexican Football Federation ordered all pro soccer games in Mexico to be played without fans in an effort to slow the spread of the virus. It also prompted cancellations of all the festivals in the country. Additionally, the Mexican race of the 2008–09 A1 GP season has had to be cancelled because of the outbreak.

The Mexican teams that qualified to the 2009 Copa Libertadores began to have problems related to the swine flu outbreak, specially the Guadalajara Chivas who travelled to Chile to play against Everton. Later, because the other teams not wanting to risk their players with the outbreak, CONMEBOL asked Guadalajara and San Luis clubs to make their games outside Mexico, both teams neglected the petition so both teams were withdrawn and Mexico was dismissed from competitions. Days later, CONMEBOL reconsidered their actions and seeded the teams in the next Libertadores Cup for the Round of 16.

See also
 Healthcare in Mexico
 Swine influenza
 Avian influenza
 COVID-19 pandemic in Mexico
 Severe acute respiratory syndrome (SARS)
 2009 swine flu pandemic in the United States

References

External links 

 Secretaria de Salud, Mexico
 "Outbreak of Swine-Origin Influenza A (H1N1) Virus Infection – Mexico, March–April 2009" – CDC Morbidity and Mortality (Dispatch) 2009-04-30
 World Health Organization (WHO): 2009 swine flu outbreak in Mexico
 Centers for Disease Control and Prevention (CDC): Swine Influenza (Flu)
 Medical Encyclopedia Medline Plus: Swine Flu
 Medical Encyclopedia WebMD: Swine Flu Center
 Worldwide Confirmed and Suspected Cases from FluCount.org

Mexico
Swine flu outbreak
Health disasters in Mexico